Paramount Movie Park Korea is a theme park and resort complex that was scheduled to open in Incheon, South Korea in 2011, however construction has yet to start. On December 6, 2018, Mohegan Gaming & Entertainment announced the strategic partnership with Paramount Pictures to bring a Paramount-branded theme park to its Inspire Integrated Entertainment Resort area, subsequently reviving the project. It is now scheduled to open in 2025.

Overview
The theme park will be based on films such as Mission: Impossible and Lara Croft: Tomb Raider. It will be the world's first Paramount Pictures-based theme park and resort complex, with the cost of $1.5 billion. Daewoo Motor Sales will fund the joint venture company while Paramount will act as its licensor and manage creative development. However, after financial problems, Mohegan Gaming & Entertainment revived its Paramount-branded theme park in December 2018 from Daewoo Motor Sales to bring its theme park as part of Phase 1B of Inspire Integrated Entertainment Resort, and it is now scheduled to open in 2025.

Though CBS & Viacom owned five amusement parks in North America, this will be the first theme park actually constructed for Paramount, while the previous Paramount Parks were originally KECO Entertainment parks which were bought and re-branded.

References

Amusement parks in South Korea
Proposed buildings and structures in South Korea